This is a list of governors for Dalarna County in Sweden, from 1634 to present. Dalarna County was known as Kopparberg County until 1997.

Footnotes

References

External links
 

Dalarna